Sidney Wheelhouse (September 1888 – 19 September 1916) was an English professional football right back, best remembered for his eight years in the Football League with Grimsby Town.

Career 

A right back, Wheelhouse began his career with Northern League clubs Bishop Auckland and Shildon Athletic before moving to the Football League to sign for Second Division club Grimsby Town in 1907. He was a regular with the Mariners for the next eight seasons and went on to captain the club, before leaving at the end of 1914–15. He returned to Blundell Park in 1916 to play in a wartime charity match.

Personal life 

He fought with the 17th (Service) Battalion of the Duke of Cambridge's Own (Middlesex Regiment) (more popularly known as the 1st Football Battalion) during the First World War and rose to the rank of lance corporal. He saw action at Delville Wood and Guillemont in July and August 1916. 

On 18 September, Wheelhouse was part of a working party which was mined while sheltering from a mortar attack and within 24 hours, he and every member of the party was dead. He is buried in Couin British Cemetery.

Career statistics

References

1888 births
1916 deaths
Footballers from Darlington
English footballers
Association football fullbacks
Bishop Auckland F.C. players
Shildon A.F.C. players
Grimsby Town F.C. players
Northern Football League players
English Football League players
British military personnel killed in the Battle of the Somme
British Army personnel of World War I
Middlesex Regiment soldiers
Military personnel from County Durham
Burials in Hauts-de-France